Kohnen-Station is a German summer-only polar research station in the Antarctic, able to accommodate up to 28 people. It is named after the geophysicist Heinz Kohnen (1938–1997), who was for a long time the head of logistics at the Alfred Wegener Institute.

The station opened on January 11, 2001, in Dronning Maud Land. The station is located at 75°00'S, 00°04'E, and 2892 m above sea level. It is located 757 km southeast of Neumayer-Station III, which lies on the Ekstrom Ice Shelf and provides logistics and administration for Kohnen-Station. Like the United Kingdom's Halley V station, the base is built on steel legs allowing the station to be jacked up as the height of the snow surface increases.

The station contains a radio room, a mess room, a kitchen, bathrooms, two bedrooms, a snow melter, a store, a workshop, and a power plant (100 kW). It is supplied by a convoy of 6 towing vehicles, which carry up to 20 tons each, and 17 sledges. The base is resupplied twice each year, with up to 6 sledge trains at a time. This traverse takes 9–14 days.

Sledges 
About 17 sledges are kept at the station. They are mainly used for transport (pulled via a snowmobile) and logistics.

Towing vehicles
About a convoy of 6 towing vehicles are stationed. They are mainly used for logistics.

PistenBully
Around 3 PistenBully snowcats are stationed at the base. They are mainly used for logistics, filling the snow melter, and clearing the snow.

Kohnen station is the logistic base for the ice coring project in Dronning Maud Land, the European Project for Ice Coring in Antarctica (EPICA). A core was also drilled at Kohnen station.

In 2019, researchers found interstellar iron in Antarctica in snow from the Kohnen Station which they relate to the Local Interstellar Cloud

See also
 List of Antarctic research stations
 List of Antarctic field camps
 Airports in Antarctica

References

External links 
 Project EPICA
 Alfred Wegener Institut

Germany and the Antarctic
Princess Martha Coast
Outposts of Queen Maud Land
2001 establishments in Antarctica